Citizen Change is a political service group, founded in 2004 by musician P. Diddy, and backed by Mary J. Blige, Mariah Carey and 50 Cent. The stated aim was to get young people and minorities to vote.  A band named CitiZEN Change from Galveston, Texas played music together from 2001-2005, who originally owned a website domain bearing the name sold it to the campaign in 2004.

History
The campaign's message, promoted on t-shirts and other things, is "Vote or Die!", a phrase adapted from Join, or Die, a well-known cartoon by Benjamin Franklin.

2004 presidential election
P. Diddy said at the time that its mission was to make voting "hot" and "sexy." The 2004 campaign included a line of "Vote or Die" t-shirts, an album, a voter registration push in cities and campuses nationwide, and commercials on such outlets as MTV and BET.

2008 presidential election
P. Diddy invoked the phrase, "Obama or Die", at the BET Awards 2008.

In pop culture

 In a South Park episode entitled "Douche and Turd", P. Diddy and his associates chase Stan Marsh around with weapons and literally threaten to kill him if he doesn't vote. 
 In 2012, the "Vote or Die!" t-shirt concept was resurrected for the Democratic National Convention in the form of parody "Vote Obama" t-shirts.

References 

Voter turnout organizations
Youth politics